Speech Services is a screen reader application developed by Google for its Android operating system. It powers applications to read aloud (speak) the text on the screen with support for many languages. Text-to-Speech may be used by apps such as Google Play Books for reading books aloud, by Google Translate for reading aloud translations providing useful insight to the pronunciation of words, by Google TalkBack and other spoken feedback accessibility-based applications, as well as by third-party apps. Users must install voice data for each language.

Supported languages 

 Albanian (Albania)
 Arabic
 Bengali (Bangladesh)
 Bengali (India)
 Bosnian (Bosnia and Herzegovina)
 Bulgarian (Bulgaria)
 Cantonese (Hong Kong)
 Chinese (China)
 Chinese (Taiwan)
 Czech (Czech Republic)
 Danish (Denmark)
 Dutch (Belgium)
 Dutch (Netherlands)
 English (Australia)
 English (Nigeria)
 English (India)
 English (United Kingdom)
 English (United States)
 Estonian (Estonia)
 Filipino (Philippines)
 Finnish (Finland)
 French (Canadian)
 French (France)
 German (Germany)
 Greek (Greece)
 Hindi (India)
 Hungarian (Hungary)
 Indonesian (Indonesia)
 Italian (Italy)
 Japanese (Japan)
 Javanese (Indonesia)
 Khmer (Cambodia)
 Korean (South Korea)
 Latvian (Latvia)
 Malay (Malaysia)
 Malayalam (India)
 Nepali (Nepal)
 Norwegian Bokmål (Norway)
 Polish (Poland)
 Portuguese (Brazil)
 Portuguese (Portugal)
 Punjabi (India)
 Romanian (Romania)
 Russian (Russia)
 Sinhala (Sri Lanka)
 Slovak (Slovakia)
 Spanish (Spain)
 Spanish (United States)
 Sundanese (Indonesia)
 Swedish (Sweden)
 Thai (Thailand)
 Turkish (Turkey)
 Ukrainian (Ukraine)
 Urdu (Pakistan)
 Vietnamese (Vietnam)

History 

Some app developers have started adapting and tweaking their Android Auto apps to include Text-to-Speech, such as Hyundai in 2015. Apps such as textPlus and WhatsApp use Text-to-Speech to read notifications aloud and provide voice-reply functionality.

Google Cloud Text-to-Speech is powered by WaveNet, software created by Google's UK-based AI subsidiary DeepMind, which was bought by Google in 2014. It tries to distinguish from its competitors, Amazon and Microsoft, with distinct AI features.

DeepMind's AI voice synthesis tech is notably advanced and realistic. Most voice synthesizers (including Apple's Siri) use concatenative synthesis, in which a program stores individual phonemes and then pieces them together to form words and sentences.

A WaveNet generates speech that sounds more natural than other text-to-speech systems. It synthesizes speech with more human-like emphasis and inflection on syllables, phonemes, and words. On average, a WaveNet produces speech audio that people prefer over other text-to-speech technologies.
Unlike most other text-to-speech systems, a WaveNet model creates raw audio waveforms from scratch. The model uses a neural network that has been trained using a large volume of speech samples. During training, the network extracts the underlying structure of the speech, such as which tones follow each other and what a realistic speech waveform looks like. When given a text input, the trained WaveNet model can generate the corresponding speech waveforms from scratch, one sample at a time, with up to 24,000 samples per second and seamless transitions between the individual sounds.

See also 
 Speech synthesis
 VoiceOver
 Live Transcribe

References

External links 
 

Speech Services
Screen readers
Computer-related introductions in 2013